Norwich is a city and county seat of Chenango County, New York, United States. Surrounded on all sides by the Town of Norwich,. The name is taken from Norwich, England. Its population was 7,051 at the 2020 census.

Lt. Warren Eaton Airport (OIC), serving the area, is located north of the city in the town of North Norwich.

History 

The first log cabin was built in 1788 by Col. William Monroe, who served as a drummer boy during the Revolutionary War. The town of Norwich was formed in 1793 from the towns of Union (now in Broome County) and Bainbridge. Afterwards, Norwich, as a "mother town" of the county, lost substantial territory in the formation of new towns. In 1806, Norwich gave up territory to form the towns of Pharsalia, Plymouth and Preston. More of Norwich was lost in 1807 to form parts of the towns of New Berlin and Columbus. In 1808 and 1820, Norwich exchanged territory with the town of Preston.

The central community of Norwich set itself off from the town in 1816 by incorporating as a village, later becoming the city of Norwich in 1914.

Geography
Unlike many upstate cities, there are few, if any, defined neighborhoods or districts. Although the city is divided into six wards for political purposes, neighborhoods are seldom referred to in this manner.

Downtown is the main commercial district of Norwich, consisting of North and South Broad streets, East and West Main streets, and lesser side streets, including American Avenue, Lackawanna Avenue, and parts of Mechanic, Fair, and Hayes streets. The downtown district is bordered on the north by Cortland and Mitchell streets, and to the south by Front Street and Eaton Avenue.

Norwich is located in upstate New York, in the Chenango River valley. The river, a tributary of the Susquehanna, winds south along the eastern edge of the city. Along the western border, Canasawacta Creek flows south, until it unites with the Chenango River at the southern city limits.

Location 
Norwich lies near the center of the triangle that can be drawn connecting the cities of Syracuse, Albany, and Binghamton, along Interstates 90, 88, and 81, respectively. The city is located at the intersection of New York State Route 12 and New York State Route 23.

Economy

For nearly a century, the city had important manufacturing firms. It was the corporate headquarters of the Norwich Pharmacal Company. Formed in 1887 as a partnership between Reverend Lafayette Moore and Oscar G. Bell, a drug store employee, the company grew to become a major developer and manufacturer of medicines and veterinary products, known for its Unguentine antiseptic dressing (introduced in 1893) and Pepto-Bismol, an upset-stomach and anti-diarrhea medication (introduced in 1901 under a different name).

The company merged with Morton International, Inc. in 1969 and later became a subsidiary of Procter & Gamble in 1982. Under corporate restructuring, Procter & Gamble divided the company into several units, each of which was subsequently sold. This caused the loss of many jobs in Norwich, resulting in the city struggling to figure out a new economic model.

In 1996, a new plant of Dan Wesson Firearms was built in Norwich and the company moved there from Massachusetts. It became a subsidiary of CZ-USA in 2005 and therefore a Colt CZ Group subsidiary since 2022.

From 1845 until 1961, Norwich was also the home of the Maydole Hammer Factory. The founder, David Maydole, was an enterprising blacksmith who set out to create a hammer with a safely attached head. His hammers proved so successful that Maydole had become the largest hammer manufacturer in the United States by the time of its founder's death in 1892.

The Chenango Canal, the New York, Ontario and Western Railway, and the Delaware, Lackawanna and Western Railroad (later Erie-Lackawanna) once served most of the city's transportation needs. Norwich was the NYO&W's Northern Division point until operations ceased on March 29, 1957. Until June 2006, the community was served by the New York, Susquehanna and Western Railroad, which operated trains on the old DL&W line between Binghamton and Utica. That service ended as a result of flood damage in 2011 to the portion of the line between Sangerfield and Chenango Forks. Following a major renovation, the line resumed freight service in May, 2017.

A new $8 million campus was constructed for the city's small extension of Morrisville State College. Due to loss of jobs in the area, population has declined, affecting both admissions and attendance at the college in recent years.

NBT Bancorp and Chobani are both headquartered in Norwich.

Route 12 bisects the city on a north-south axis, becoming North and South Broad Street within city limits. A community of downtown businesses is found along it. On the north side of town lies the North Plaza, desolate since the departure of anchor tenant Jamesway, and a commercial strip of gas stations and fast food outlets. To the south are three plazas just outside city limits, featuring supermarkets, gas stations, fast food, Lowe's and Walmart.

Norwich residents usually travel to the larger nearby cities of Oneonta, Binghamton, Utica, sometimes Cortland, and occasionally the much larger metropolitan areas of Syracuse and Albany, for goods and services unobtainable locally.

Demographics

As of the census of 2000, there were 7,355 people, 3,131 households, and 1,671 families residing in the city. The population density was 3,609.0 people per square mile (1,392.0/km2). There were 3,500 housing units at an average density of 1,717.4 per square mile (662.4/km2). The racial makeup of the city was 96.48% White, 1.39% Black or African American, 0.27% Native American, 0.69% Asian, 0.19% from other races, and 0.98% from two or more races. Hispanic or Latino of any race were 0.68% of the population.

There were 3,131 households, out of which 28.6% had children under the age of 18 living with them, 35.6% were married couples living together, 13.4% had a female householder with no husband present, and 46.6% were non-families. 40.2% of all households were made up of individuals, and 19.0% had someone living alone who was 65 years of age or older. The average household size was 2.19 and the average family size was 2.95.

In the city, the population was spread out, with 24.6% under the age of 18, 8.2% from 18 to 24, 26.1% from 25 to 44, 20.0% from 45 to 64, and 21.2% who were 65 years of age or older. The median age was 39 years. For every 100 females, there were 78.9 males. For every 100 females age 18 and over, there were 75.0 males.

The median income for a household in the city was $28,485, and the median income for a family was $39,808. Males had a median income of $33,537 versus $24,430 for females. The per capita income for the city was $17,339. About 14.7% of families and 18.7% of the population were below the poverty line, including 28.5% of those under age 18 and 9.2% of those age 65 or over.

Culture
The Chenango Arts Council serves as a year-round arts and entertainment hub for the Norwich community and surrounding counties. Located in the former Norwich High School building on the city's west side, the Council includes a unique two-level art gallery, art instruction classrooms and the circa 1922 515-seat Martin Kappel Theater. The broadroom-style auditorium was listed in the League of Historic Theaters in 1989, and underwent an extensive renovation in 1995 after years of abandonment with contributions from local government, corporate donors and hundreds of former alumni of the high school. Each year, the stage hosts the Chenango Arts Council's Annual Performance Series, regular performances by the Norwich Theater Company and serves as a venue for many community organizations and businesses. The Martin Kappel Theater hosted the Twin Tiers International Film Festival in September 2018.

The Chenango Arts Council serves as a New York State Council on the Arts (NYSCA) multi-county DEC site, administering and re-granting more than $100,000 of funding annually directly to artists and community arts initiatives in Broome, Chenango and Otsego counties.

Numerous festivals and events mark the Norwich calendar, with residents looking forward to several annual cultural traditions. These include the Colorscape Chenango Arts Festival, a two-day event in early September that features regional musicians and artists, and the Chenango Blues Festival, held at the Chenango County Fairgrounds each August-attracting thousands and featured nationally renowned artists such as Koko Taylor, Luther Allison, and The Fabulous Thunderbirds. Since the early 1990s, the nationally known Gus Macker organization has hosted a 3-on-3 basketball tournament in early July, with hundreds of teams participating each year.

Museums include the Chenango County Historical Society and the Northeast Classic Car Museum, which houses over 160 classic cars, including the world's largest collection of Franklin automobiles.

Notable people
 Joe Angelino, member of the New York State Assembly
Ruth Fulton Benedict, anthropologist
Gail Borden, inventor and dairy pioneer
Bonnie Campbell, attorney and politician in Iowa
Edward J. Erickson, retired U.S. Army officer and historian
Calista Flockhart, actress
Jon Matlack, former New York Mets pitcher
Clarence D. Rappleyea Jr., attorney and member of the New York State Assembly
Lillian Belle Sage, educator and scientist
 Harry Stack Sullivan, psychiatrist
 John Prindle Scott, composer
 Hamdi Ulukaya, founder of Chobani Yogurt
Jessamine S. Whitney, statistician 
William M. Fenton, Former Lt. Governor of Michigan

Gallery

References

External links

 City of Norwich official website
 Chenango Arts Council
 Commerce Chenango
 Chenango County Historical Society
 Morrisville State College - Norwich Campus
 Colorscape Chenango Arts Festival
 Chenango Blues Festival
 Northeast Classic Car Museum
 Timeline of Norwich Pharmacal Company
 

Cities in New York (state)
County seats in New York (state)
Populated places established in 1788
Cities in Chenango County, New York
1788 establishments in New York (state)